The 2002–03 Indiana Hoosiers men's basketball team represented Indiana University in the 2002–03 college basketball season. Their head coach was Mike Davis, who was in his third season. The team played its home games at Assembly Hall in Bloomington, Indiana, and was a member of the Big Ten Conference.

Indiana finished the season with an overall record of 21–13 and a conference record of 8–8, good for 6th place in the Big Ten Conference. After beating Penn State in the opening round and Michigan in the quarterfinals, the Hoosiers fell to Illinois (72–73) in the semifinals of the Big Ten tournament. The Hoosiers then defeated Alabama in the first round of the NCAA tournament before losing to the Pittsburgh Panthers in the second round, thus ending the 2002–03 season.

2002–03 Roster

Schedule and results

|-
!colspan=9| Regular Season
|-

|-
!colspan=9| Big Ten tournament

|-
!colspan=9| NCAA tournament

References

Indiana Hoosiers
Indiana
Indiana Hoosiers men's basketball seasons
2002 in sports in Indiana
2003 in sports in Indiana